In the Department of Homeland Security Appropriations Act, 2005,() President Bush gave:

 $28.9 billion in net discretionary spending for the Department of Homeland Security 
 $419.2 million in new funding to enhance border and port security activities
 $2.5 billion for Project BioShield 
 $894 million for Information Analysis and Infrastructure Protection 
 $5.1 billion for the Transportation Security Administration
 $475 million to continue deploying more efficient baggage screening at airports
 $115 million for air cargo security
 $663 million for Federal Air Marshals (FAMS) program
 $61 million is appropriated to the DHS Science and Technology directorate
 $4 billion for state and local assistance programs or First Responders
 179 million for improvements in immigration enforcement 
 160 million in total resources towards immigration application processing
 $3.1 billion for the Emergency Preparedness and Response Directorate
 15 million for the National Incident Management System (NIMS)

President George W. Bush signed the 2005 Act on October 18, 2004.

See also
 United States Department of Homeland Security
 Homeland Security Act

External links
 HSAA 2005
 Pryce: America Safer Today than Two Years Ago

United States federal defense and national security legislation
Appropriations Act
Acts of the 108th United States Congress
United States federal appropriations legislation